Le Clandestin (also known as Taxi el makhfi , Algerian Arabic for "The Clandestine Taxi") is an Algerian comedy film directed by Benamar Bakhti, produced in 1989 (or 1991), starring Athmane Ariouet and Yahia Benmabrouk. It's considered one of the most remarkable films in Algerian cinema.

Plot
A group of people trying to travel from Bou Saâda, M'Sila to Algiers who are unable to find a suitable mean of transport. They finally have to take an outdated illegal taxicap "un clandestine" of a poor man who has many children. Comedian conversations and many troubles take place during the trip.

Cast
 Athmane Ariouet
 Yahia Benmabrouk
 
 
 
 
 Sissani
 Himoud Brahimi
 Aziz Anik

References

External links
Le Clandestin on IMDB
Le Clandestin on Youtube

Algerian comedy films
Films shot in Algeria
1989 films
1991 films